The 1890 Invercargill mayoral election was held on 26 November 1890.

Results
The following table gives the election results:

References

1890 elections in New Zealand
Mayoral elections in Invercargill